20 (twenty; Roman numeral XX) is the natural number following 19 and preceding 21. A group of twenty units may also be referred to as a score.

In mathematics 

Twenty is a pronic number, as it is the product of consecutive integers, namely 4 and 5. It is the third composite number to be the product of a squared prime and a prime, and also the second member of the (22)q family in this form. 

20 is the smallest primitive abundant number. 

20 is the third tetrahedral number.

20 is the basis for vigesimal number systems.

20 is the number of parallelogram polyominoes with 5 cells.

20 is the number of moves (quarter or half turns) required to optimally solve a Rubik's Cube in the worst case.

There are twenty edge-to-edge 2-uniform tilings by convex regular polygons, which are uniform tessellations of the plane containing 2 orbits of vertices.

The largest number of faces a Platonic solid can have is twenty faces, which make up a regular icosahedron. A dodecahedron, on the other hand, has twenty vertices, likewise the most a regular polyhedron can have.

There are four uniform compound polyhedra that contain twenty polyhedra (UC13, UC14, UC19, UC33), the most any such solids can have, while another twenty compounds contain five polyhedra. The compound of twenty octahedra can be obtained by orienting two pairs of compounds of ten octahedra, which can also coincide to yield a regular compound of five octahedra. 

There are twenty semiregular polytopes, inclusive of the 13 Archimedean solids, and 7 Gosset polytopes that exist up through the eighth dimension. These, without counting chiral forms of the snub cube and snub dodecahedron, or the infinite family of semiregular prisms and antiprisms that exists in the third dimension.

The Happy Family of sporadic groups is made up of twenty finite simple groups that are all subquotients of the friendly giant, the largest sporadic group. The largest supersingular prime factor that divides the order of the friendly giant is 71, which is the 20th indexed prime number.

In science 

The atomic number of calcium.
The third magic number in physics.
The International Astronomical Union shower number for Coma Berenicids.

Biology 

The number of proteinogenic amino acids that are encoded by the standard genetic code.
In some countries, the number 20 is used as an index in measuring visual acuity. 20/20 indicates normal vision at 20 feet, although it is commonly used to mean "perfect vision". (Note that this applies only to countries using the Imperial system. The metric equivalent is 6/6.) When someone is able to see only after an event how things turned out, that person is often said to have had "20/20 hindsight".

As an indefinite number 

 A 'score' is a group of 20 (often used in combination with a cardinal number, i.e. fourscore to mean 80), but also often used as an indefinite number (e.g. the newspaper headline "Scores of Typhoon Survivors Flown to Manila").

In sports 

 Twenty20 is a form of limited overs cricket where each team plays only 20 overs.
 A standard dartboard is laid out as 20 sectors.
 The Kentucky Derby currently has a maximum field of 20 horses.
 In rugby union, 20 national teams currently qualify for each edition of the men's Rugby World Cup.
 In chess, 20 is the number of legal moves for each player in the starting position.
 In Australian rules football, most games consist of four 20-minute quarters.
 Under NCAA men's basketball rules, games consist of 20-minute halves.
 Ice hockey games are played in three 20-minute periods.
The current Formula 1 field size is 20.
20 was used by Tony Stewart and Joe Gibbs Racing to win the 2002 and 2005 NASCAR Cup Series championships. It is currently used by Christopher Bell.

Age 20 
In many disciplines of developmental psychology, adulthood starts at age 20.
Formerly the age of majority in Japan and in Japanese tradition.
Age 20 is the age at which Levites in the time of King David were allowed "to do the work for the service of the house of the Lord", the Temple in Jerusalem (see First Chronicles Chapter 23, verses 24 and 27). In the time of Ezra and Nehemiah, following the Babylonian captivity, it was Levites from the age of 20 upwards who were assigned "to oversee the work of the house of the LORD" (Ezra Chapter 3, verse 8).

Music

In other fields 

+20 is the code for international direct dial phone calls to Egypt.
CB slang for a place, being short for the ten-code "10–20" meaning "What is your location?"
20/20 is a primetime newsmagazine program on ABC, which in turn is taken from the expression for normal eyesight (20/20 vision).
020 is the ISO 3166-1 numeric 3 digit country code for Andorra.
The UIC Country Code for Russia identifying member countries of the International Union of Railways (UIC).
20 is the value of the letter J when computing the check digit in the serial number of an intermodal (shipping) container, as defined by ISO 6346.
In Hebrew numerals, the letter Kaph (כ) represents twenty; see also gematria, the Hebrew system of numerology. Similarly the Arabic letter kāf (ك) represents twenty in the Abjad numerals.
The number of questions in the game Twenty Questions.

See also
 List of highways numbered 20

References

External links 

Integers